Ken or Kenneth Russell may refer to:

Kenneth William Russell, British pilot, see 1951 New Year Honours
Ken Russell (1927–2011), English film director
Ken Russell (American football) (1935–2014), tackle for Detroit Lions from 1957 to 1959
Ken Russell (politician) (born 1973), American Democratic politician, member of Miami City Commission from 2015 to 2022
Kenneth S. Russell, Australian astronomer, active since 1963, discoverer of comets 83D/Russell, 91P/Russell and 94P/Russell
Kenneth W. Russell (1950–1992), American anthropologist after whom fellowship at American Center of Oriental Research is named
Kenneth Charles Russell (1951–1993), American jockey after whom Ken Russell Memorial Classic is named
Kenneth Russell, Bahamian MP, successful candidate in Bahamian general election, 1997 and 2002
Kenneth Bradley Russell, American software developer, in 2015, of Java OpenGL

See also 
Kenneth Russell Mallen (1884–1930), Canadian ice hockey player
Kenneth Russell Hayward, British pilot (see 1954 Birthday Honours)
Kenneth Russell Unger (1898–1979), American rear admiral and World War I flying ace
Kenneth Cork (Kenneth Russell Cork, 1913–1991), Lord Mayor of London during 1978–79